Fred Millett (19201980) was a British muralist and poster artist whose work was exhibited at the Festival of Britain and who was commissioned by London County Council, London Transport, National Westminster Bank, York University, and the General Post Office.

Early life and family
Fred Millett was born in 1920. He studied at the Central School of Art in London.

Career
Primarily a muralist and poster artist, Millett's work was exhibited at the Festival of Britain and he was commissioned by London County Council, London Transport, National Westminster Bank, the University of York, and the General Post Office.

Around 1952, Millett painted murals of Autumn, Winter, and Summer at St Crispin's School in Wokingham, Berkshire.

From the middle 1960s, he taught Perception and Communication at the Polytechnic of Central London.

Death
Millett died in 1980.

Selected works

Murals

 Assembly Hall mural at Danegrove Primary School, East Barnet.
 Seasons Murals, St Crispin's School, Wokingham, Berkshire, c. 1952.
 Mosaic tiles at the Locarno Dancehall, now Coventry Central Library, 1958–60.

Posters
 The Tufted Duck, London Transport, 1962.
 London after Dark, London Transport, 1968.

Sculpture
 Six sculptural relief panels in concrete at Derwent College, University of York, 1965.
 Sculpted Wall, Raglan Estate, Camden, 1965.

References

External links
 

1920 births
1980 deaths
British muralists
British poster artists
Alumni of the Central School of Art and Design